The Brønlund Fjord Group is a geologic group in Greenland. It preserves fossils dating back to the Cambrian period.

See also

 List of fossiliferous stratigraphic units in Greenland

References
 

Geologic groups of Europe
Geologic groups of North America
Geologic formations of Greenland
Cambrian Greenland